Ángel Mateo Charris  known as Charris (born 1962 in Cartagena, Murcia) is a Spanish painter. His work is included in the figurative line that has been called "neometaphysical" to which other artists of his generation belong such as Gonzalo Sicre, Joel Mestre, Dis Berlin and others.

Biography 

Charris was born in Cartagena on May 10, 1962 and graduated from the San Carlos Fine Arts College (Valencia) in 1985. During the 80s he participated  in various collective exhibitions. In 1988 he first travels to New York, getting in contact with the paintings of Edward Hopper and the artists of the Hudson River School. In 1989 he was awarded the Young Photographers National Competition from the Spanish Youth Institute.

In 1997, with Gonzalo Sicre, he edited the book "In the Footsteps of Hopper". In 1999, the IVAM dedicates a major exhibition to him in its Centro del Carmen.

Works 

Charris' style is heavily influenced by comics, pop art, comic visual language, noir cinema, and certain classical authors, among them and especially, Edward Hopper. In his works, it is also very common to see references to art history, as well as certain literary links. His works are also characterized by constant references to the History of Art and approaches to postmodernism. His work references Spilliaert, Ruscha, Rothko, Morandi, and De Chirico; he demonstrably has a preference for travel literature.

His work is in collections such as Fundación Argentaria, Coca-Cola Foundation, Bancaixa Collection, Collection Testimoni La Caixa, Museo Nacional Centro de Arte Reina Sofia, the IVAM, Artium of Vitoria and others.

Major exhibitions
The most important monographic exhibitions that have been made about his work are:
 'Who's afraid of the Turner Prize'. T20 Gallery. Murcia. May 2010

References

External links 
Charris website
Gallery My Name's Lolita Art
Article in the Spend-in magazine

1962 births
Living people
20th-century Spanish painters
20th-century Spanish male artists
Spanish male painters
21st-century Spanish painters
People from Cartagena, Spain
21st-century Spanish male artists